Ion implantation is a low-temperature process by which ions of one element are accelerated into a solid target, thereby changing the physical, chemical, or electrical properties of the target. Ion implantation is used in semiconductor device fabrication and in metal finishing, as well as in materials science research. The ions can alter the elemental composition of the target (if the ions differ in composition from the target) if they stop and remain in the target.  Ion implantation also causes chemical and physical changes when the ions impinge on the target at high energy. The crystal structure of the target can be damaged or even destroyed by the energetic collision cascades, and ions of sufficiently high energy (tens of MeV) can cause nuclear transmutation.

General principle 

Ion implantation equipment typically consists of an ion source, where ions of the desired element are produced, an accelerator, where the ions are electrostatically accelerated to a high energy or using radiofrequency, and a target chamber, where the ions impinge on a target, which is the material to be implanted. Thus ion implantation is a special case of particle radiation. Each ion is typically a single atom or molecule, and thus the actual amount of material implanted in the target is the integral over time of the ion current. This amount is called the dose. The currents supplied by implants are typically small (micro-amperes), and thus the dose which can be implanted in a reasonable amount of time is small. Therefore, ion implantation finds application in cases where the amount of chemical change required is small.

Typical ion energies are in the range of 10 to 500 keV (1,600 to 80,000 aJ). Energies in the range 1 to 10 keV (160 to 1,600 aJ) can be used, but result in a penetration of only a few nanometers or less. Energies lower than this result in very little damage to the target, and fall under the designation ion beam deposition. Higher energies can also be used: accelerators capable of 5 MeV (800,000 aJ) are common. However, there is often great structural damage to the target, and because the depth distribution is broad (Bragg peak), the net composition change at any point in the target will be small.

The energy of the ions, as well as the ion species and the composition of the target determine the depth of penetration of the ions in the solid: A monoenergetic ion beam will generally have a broad depth distribution. The average penetration depth is called the range of the ions. Under typical circumstances ion ranges will be between 10 nanometers and 1 micrometer. Thus, ion implantation is especially useful in cases where the chemical or structural change is desired to be near the surface of the target. Ions gradually lose their energy as they travel through the solid, both from occasional collisions with target atoms (which cause abrupt energy transfers) and from a mild drag from overlap of electron orbitals, which is a continuous process. The loss of ion energy in the target is called stopping and can be simulated with the binary collision approximation method.

Accelerator systems for ion implantation are generally classified into medium current (ion beam currents between 10 μA and ~2 mA), high current (ion beam currents up to ~30 mA), high energy (ion energies above 200 keV and up to 10 MeV), and very high dose (efficient implant of dose greater than 1016 ions/cm2).

Ion source 
All varieties of ion implantation beamline designs contain general groups of functional components (see image). The first major segment of an ion beamline includes an ion source used to generate the ion species. The source is closely coupled to biased electrodes for extraction of the ions into the beamline and most often to some means of selecting a particular ion species for transport into the main accelerator section.

The "mass" selection (just like in mass spectrometer) is often accompanied by passage of the extracted ion beam through a magnetic field region with an exit path restricted by blocking apertures, or "slits", that allow only ions with a specific value of the product of mass and velocity/charge to continue down the beamline. If the target surface is larger than the ion beam diameter and a uniform distribution of implanted dose is desired over the target surface, then some combination of beam scanning and wafer motion is used. Finally, the implanted surface is coupled with some method for collecting the accumulated charge of the implanted ions so that the delivered dose can be measured in a continuous fashion and the implant process stopped at the desired dose level.

Application in semiconductor device fabrication

Doping
Semiconductor doping with boron, phosphorus, or arsenic is a common application of ion implantation. When implanted in a semiconductor, each dopant atom can create a charge carrier in the semiconductor after annealing. A hole can be created for a p-type dopant, and an electron for an n-type dopant. This modifies the conductivity of the semiconductor in its vicinity.  The technique is used, for example, for adjusting the threshold voltage of a MOSFET.

Ion implantation was developed as a method of producing the p-n junction of photovoltaic devices in the late 1970s and early 1980s, along with the use of pulsed-electron beam for rapid annealing, although pulsed-electron beam for rapid annealing has not to date been used for commercial production.

Silicon on insulator
One prominent method for preparing silicon on insulator (SOI) substrates from conventional silicon substrates is the SIMOX (separation by implantation of oxygen) process, wherein a buried high dose oxygen implant is converted to silicon oxide by a high temperature annealing process.

Mesotaxy
Mesotaxy is the term for the growth of a crystallographically matching phase underneath the surface of the host crystal (compare to epitaxy, which is the growth of the matching phase on the surface of a substrate). In this process, ions are implanted at a high enough energy and dose into a material to create a layer of a second phase, and the temperature is controlled so that the crystal structure of the target is not destroyed. The crystal orientation of the layer can be engineered to match that of the target, even though the exact crystal structure and lattice constant may be very different. For example, after the implantation of nickel ions into a silicon wafer, a layer of nickel silicide can be grown in which the crystal orientation of the silicide matches that of the silicon.

Application in metal finishing

Tool steel toughening
Nitrogen or other ions can be implanted into a tool steel target (drill bits, for example). The structural change caused by the implantation produces a surface compression in the steel, which prevents crack propagation and thus makes the material more resistant to fracture. The chemical change can also make the tool more resistant to corrosion.

Surface finishing
In some applications, for example prosthetic devices such as artificial joints, it is desired to have surfaces very resistant to both chemical corrosion and wear due to friction. Ion implantation is used in such cases to engineer the surfaces of such devices for more reliable performance. As in the case of tool steels, the surface modification caused by ion implantation includes both a surface compression which prevents crack propagation and an alloying of the surface to make it more chemically resistant to corrosion.

Other applications

Ion beam mixing
Ion implantation can be used to achieve ion beam mixing, i.e. mixing up atoms of different elements at an interface. This may be useful for achieving graded interfaces or strengthening adhesion between layers of immiscible materials.

Ion implantation-induced nanoparticle formation
Ion implantation may be used to induce nano-dimensional particles in oxides such as sapphire and silica. The particles may be formed as a result of precipitation of the ion implanted species, they may be formed as a result of the production of a mixed oxide species that contains both the ion-implanted element and the oxide substrate, and they may be formed as a result of a reduction of the substrate, first reported by Hunt and Hampikian. Typical ion beam energies used to produce nanoparticles range from 50 to 150 keV, with ion fluences that range from 1016 to 1018 ions/cm2. The table below summarizes some of the work that has been done in this field for a sapphire substrate. A wide variety of nanoparticles can be formed, with size ranges from 1 nm on up to 20 nm and with compositions that can contain the implanted species, combinations of the implanted ion and substrate, or that are comprised solely from the cation associated with the substrate.

Composite materials based on dielectrics such as sapphire that contain dispersed metal nanoparticles are promising materials for optoelectronics and nonlinear optics.

Problems with ion implantation

Crystallographic damage
Each individual ion produces many point defects in the target crystal on impact such as vacancies and interstitials. Vacancies are crystal lattice points unoccupied by an atom: in this case the ion collides with a target atom, resulting in transfer of a significant amount of energy to the target atom such that it leaves its crystal site. This target atom then itself becomes a projectile in the solid, and can cause successive collision events.
Interstitials result when such atoms (or the original ion itself) come to rest in the solid, but find no vacant space in the lattice to reside. These point defects can migrate and cluster with each other, resulting in dislocation loops and other defects.

Damage recovery
Because ion implantation causes damage to the crystal structure of the target which is often unwanted, ion implantation processing is often followed by a thermal annealing. This can be referred to as damage recovery.

Amorphization
The amount of crystallographic damage can be enough to completely amorphize the surface of the target: i.e. it can become an amorphous solid (such a solid produced from a melt is called a glass). In some cases, complete amorphization of a target is preferable to a highly defective crystal: An amorphized film can be regrown at a lower temperature than required to anneal a highly damaged crystal. Amorphisation of the substrate can occur as a result of the beam damage. For example, yttrium ion implantation into sapphire at an ion beam energy of 150 keV to a fluence of 5*1016 Y+/cm2 produces an amorphous glassy layer approximately 110 nm in thickness, measured from the outer surface. [Hunt, 1999]

Sputtering
Some of the collision events result in atoms being ejected (sputtered) from the surface, and thus ion implantation will slowly etch away a surface. The effect is only appreciable for very large doses.

Ion channelling

If there is a crystallographic structure to the target, and especially in semiconductor substrates where the crystal structure is more open, particular crystallographic directions offer much lower stopping than other directions. The result is that the range of an ion can be much longer if the ion travels exactly along a particular direction, for example the <110> direction in silicon and other diamond cubic materials. This effect is called ion channelling, and, like all the channelling effects, is highly nonlinear, with small variations from perfect orientation resulting in extreme differences in implantation depth.  For this reason, most implantation is carried out a few degrees off-axis, where tiny alignment errors will have more predictable effects.

Ion channelling can be used directly in Rutherford backscattering and related techniques as an analytical method to determine the amount and depth profile of damage in crystalline thin film materials.

Safety

Hazardous materials 
In fabricating wafers, toxic materials such as arsine and phosphine are often used in the ion implanter process. Other common carcinogenic, corrosive, flammable, or toxic elements include antimony, arsenic, phosphorus, and boron. Semiconductor fabrication facilities are highly automated, but residue of hazardous elements in machines can be encountered during servicing and in vacuum pump hardware.

High voltages and particle accelerators 
High voltage power supplies used in ion accelerators necessary for ion implantation can pose a risk of electrical injury.  In addition, high-energy atomic collisions can generate X-rays and, in some cases, other ionizing radiation and radionuclides. In addition to high voltage, particle accelerators such as radio frequency linear particle accelerators and laser wakefield plasma accelerators present other hazards.

See also
 Stopping and Range of Ions in Matter

References

External links 

Materials science
Semiconductor device fabrication
Semiconductor technology
Glass coating and surface modification